is a Japanese synchronised swimmer.

He participated at the 2019 World Aquatics Championships, winning a medal.

References

1982 births
Living people
Japanese synchronized swimmers
Male synchronized swimmers
World Aquatics Championships medalists in synchronised swimming
Artistic swimmers at the 2019 World Aquatics Championships
Synchronized swimmers at the 2015 World Aquatics Championships
21st-century Japanese women